Radnički nogometni klub Split, commonly known as RNK Split, is a Croatian football club based in the city of Split.

History
The club had a strong fanbase in the Split's shipyard. The club was founded on 16 April 1912 as Anarch, but has had several names like Borac, Jug, HAŠK, Dalmatinac, and Arsenal since then.

During the Spanish Civil War, RNK Split organized an unsuccessful expedition of his volunteers for the fight on the side of the anti-fascist coalition against Francisco Franco's forces.

In World War II, the club became well-known because 120 of its players were killed fighting on the side of Josip Broz Tito's Partisans, fighting against Axis forces.

After achieving three consecutive promotions from 2008 to 2010, the club went from playing in Croatia's fourth tier to playing in the Croatian First League, Croatia's top division.

In the team's first season in the top flight in the 2010–11 season, they achieved a very respectable third spot. Because of its finish that season, they qualified to play for Europe for the first time in the club's existence and entered into the 2011–12 UEFA Europa League second qualifying round where they met Slovenian side Domžale. They won 5–2 on aggregate and in the third qualifying round they were drawn against Premier League side Fulham, whom they lost to 2–0 on aggregate.

In the 2014–15 season, the club managed to reach the Europa League playoff round after defeating Mika, Hapoel Be'er Sheva and Chornomorets Odesa, but lost 1–0 on aggregate to Italian Serie A side Torino.

Crest and colours
Founded as HRŠD "Anarch", the club's first colors were black (the color of Anarchists). HRŠD stood for Hrvatsko radničko športsko društvo (Croatian Workingmen's Sports Society). In 1933, as influence of "red" (organized labour, Social democrat and Communist) youth grew stronger, the club changed its colors to all red and its name to Radnički nogometni klub Split (Workingmen's Football Club Split).

During SFR Yugoslavia RNK Split played in the top football division four times, but did not win a Championship or Cup title. The biggest success in the Yugoslav Cup was in the season of 1960–61, when they lost in the semi-finals against the Macedonian team Vardar in the game on Vardar's home stadium.

Honours

1. HNL Third place (1):
2010–11
Croatian Football Cup Runners-up (1):
2014–15
Yugoslav Second League Winner (2):
1956–57 (Zone I), 1959–60 (West)
Croatian Republic Football League Winner (1):
1983–84 (South)
2. HNL Winner (3):
1996–97 (South), 1997–98 (South), 2009–10
3. HNL Winner (1):
2008–09 (South)
4. HNL Winner (1):
2007–08 (South)

Recent seasons

Key

P = Played
W = Games won
D = Games drawn
L = Games lost
F = Goals for
A = Goals against
Pts = Points
Pos = Final position
1. HNL = Croatian First League
2. HNL = Croatian Second League
3. HNL = Croatian Third League
4. HNL = Croatian Fourth League
1. ŽNL = First County League
S-D = Split-Dalmatia
R1 = Round 1
R2 = Round 2
QF = Quarter-finals
SF = Semi-finals
RU = Runners-up
W  = Winners

European record

Summary

Source: uefa.com, Last updated on 28 August 2014Pld = Matches played; W = Matches won; D = Matches drawn; L = Matches lost; GF = Goals for; GA = Goals against

By result

By season

Managers

 Luka Kaliterna (1940–41), (1946–47), (1954–58)
 Frane Matošić (1959–61)
 Luka Kaliterna (1961–62)
 Frane Matošić (1963–64)
 Ivo Radovniković (1963–64)
 Ozren Nedoklan (1965–66)
 Luka Kaliterna (1966–67)
 Tomislav Ivić (1967–68)
 Ljubomir Kokeza (1968)
 Stanko Poklepović (1969)
 Ljubomir Kokeza (1970–71)
 Stanko Poklepović (1971–72)
 Lenko Grčić (1972–73)
 Zlatomir Obradov (1975)
 Zlatko Papec (1978–80)
 Vladimir Beara (1980–81)
 Zlatko Papec (1981–82)
 Vinko Begović (1986–87)
 Mićun Jovanić (1991)
 Vjeran Simunić (1999–00)
 Stipe Milardović (2007–08)
 Milo Nižetić (2008–09)
 Tonči Bašić (2009–10)
 Ivan Katalinić (2010–11)
 Tonči Bašić (2011–12)
 Zoran Vulić (2012–13)
 Goran Sablić (interim) (2013)
 Stanko Mršić (2013–14)
 Ivan Matić (2014)
 Zoran Vulić (2014–15)
 Goran Sablić (2015–16)
 Vjekoslav Lokica (2016–17)
 Bruno Akrapović (2017)
 Ivan Pudar (2017–2018) 
 Armando Marenzi (2018–2020) 
 Ivan Radeljić (2020-)

References

External links
 
RNK Split profile at UEFA.com
RNK Split at  Soccerway
Slaven Žužul blog 

 
Association football clubs established in 1912
Football clubs in Croatia
Football clubs in Split-Dalmatia County
Football clubs in Yugoslavia
Football clubs in Split, Croatia
1912 establishments in Croatia